Kim So-yeon (born 1980) is a South Korean actress.

Kim So-yeon or Kim So-yon may also refer to:
Kim So-yeon (writer) (born 1967), South Korean poet
Kim So-yeon (activist) (born 1970), South Korean presidential candidates, 2012
Kassy (born 1995), South Korean singer born Kim So-yeon
 (born 1970), the fifth wife of former German chancellor Gerhard Schröder
Kim So-yeon (born 1972), South Korean actress Kim Ga-yeon
Kim So-yeon (badminton) (born 1982), South Korean badminton player